The 2019–20 Southern Illinois Salukis men's basketball team represented Southern Illinois University Carbondale during the 2019–20 NCAA Division I men's basketball season. The Salukis were led by first-year head coach Bryan Mullins and played their home games at the Banterra Center (formerly SIU Arena) in Carbondale, Illinois as members of the Missouri Valley Conference. They finished the season 16–16, 10–8 in MVC play to finish in fifth place. They lost in the quarterfinals of the MVC tournament to Bradley.

Previous season
The Salukis finished the 2018–19 season 17–15 overall, 10–8 in MVC play, finishing in a tie for third place. As the No. 3 seed in the MVC tournament, the Salukis were upset by No. 6 seed Northern Iowa in the quarterfinals.

In an emotional news conference following the game, Southern Illinois head coach Barry Hinson, announced he was stepping down as the coach of the Salukis. On March 20, 2019, the school hired former SIU star point guard and Loyola assistant coach Bryan Mullins as head coach.

Roster

Schedule and results

|-
!colspan=12 style=| Exhibition

|-
!colspan=12 style=| Non-conference regular season

|-
!colspan=12 style=| Missouri Valley regular season

|-
!colspan=12 style=| Missouri Valley tournament

References

2017-18
2019–20 Missouri Valley Conference men's basketball season
2019 in sports in Illinois
2020 in sports in Illinois